Avdiivka Coke and Chemical Plant (AKHZ) in Donetsk Oblast, Ukraine, is the largest coke producer in Ukraine and is owned by the company Metinvest, which is in turn owned by Rinat Akhmetov, a Ukrainian oligarch. AKHZ also produces a variety of chemicals including benzine, coal tar, coal oil ammonium sulphate and coke gas. At present Avdiivka Coke plant consists of 13 main and 30 auxiliary workshops as well as service structural divisions.

History 
The plant was constructed in 1963 by the Ukrainian Soviet Socialist Republic to fulfil the coke needs of the nearby Mariupol Steel Works as well as the availability of coal from local mines. Originally opening with 1 coke battery, this expanded to nine by 1980 with investment from the Soviet Union. By 1988, 100 million tons of coke had been produced making it a major coke producer in Europe. In 1993 as Ukraine gained independence, the plant was privatised as the Open Joint Stock Company 'Avdeevskiy Coke-processing Works'.Starting in Mid-April 2014, pro-Russian separatists captured several towns in Donetsk Oblast; including Avdiivka. In July 2014 fighting between the separatists and the Ukrainian army (during which Ukrainian forces secured the city from the pro-Russian separatists) damaged the Coke plant which was hit by 165 mortars during the conflict. The plant stopped working on 17 August 2014 due to the increasing violence. On 5 February 2015, the workers of the plant published an open letter to Ukrainian President Petro Poroshenko, accusing the 25th Airborne Brigade and the volunteer Aidar Battalion of opening fire from residential areas, asking that they be removed from the town. The letter also claimed that the town had been without water, heat and electricity for the previous six months and warned of the ecological catastrophe that could follow from further shelling of the plant. After being recaptured by the Ukrainian army, production resumed, albeit at one third capacity. Much of the plant had been damaged and it was being managed from a Soviet era bunker underneath the site in order to avoid shelling. In January 2017, Russian separatists shelled the town of Avdiivka with rounds from a BM-21 Grad, causing heavy damage to the plant's generators and disrupting gas production, as well as leaving the town without heating for several days. This shelling killed the 10th factory employee to die since the start of the War in Donbass.  During the 2022 Russian Invasion of Ukraine, Russian forces bombarded and damaged the coke plant again.

Production

Before the war in Ukraine, production was 12,000 tons of coke per day, worth $2.4m. However, this has fallen by two thirds due to the conflict. Avdiivka Coke is one of the top-five coke producers in Europe and the largest coke-producer in Ukraine. Currently AKHZ produces about 40 types of products and the share of the plant exceeds 20% of gross coke output in Ukraine. It sells coke to Azovstal, Yenakiieve Steel and Ilyich Steel as well as to customers outside of the Metinvest group of companies such as Arcelor Mittal Kryvyi Rih. Avdeyevka Coke currently produces coke at eight out of its nine coke batteries.

The plant has seen considerable investment over the last in environmental equipment and facilities including sulphur removal and heat exchangers to reduce energy consumption. The plant is considered important to steel production in Ukraine.

References

External links 
 
 

Chemical companies of Ukraine
Economy of Donetsk Oblast
Chemical companies of the Soviet Union
Chemical companies established in 1963
Non-renewable resource companies established in 1963
1963 establishments in Ukraine
Metinvest
Avdiivka
Coking works